Shakti Bahadur Basnet (born 14 April 1971) is a Nepalese politician and current Minister of Forest and Environment. He is a Central Committee Member of Nepal Communist Party.

He served as Minister of Home Affairs. He inaugurated the campaign "Police My Friend". On December 2015, he had taken actions against the protesters hurling petrol bombs towards President Bidhya Bhandari at Janakpur, Nepal. PM KP Oli expressed discontent with him after he acted against the PM's instruction to stop the transfer of CDOs. He served as Minister of Health and Population under the prime minister Jhala Nath Khanal. He was elected in the 2017 Nepalese legislative election from Jajarkot district constituency number 1.

Early years 
In 1990, he began his active career into politics with alias Suresh Singh. In 1998, he was selected as Central Committee Member of UCPN Maoist.

Family 
He was born in Kalegaun, Jajarkot, Nepal to father Danda Bir Basnet and mother Dharma Kumari Basnet. He is married to fellow politician Satya Pahadi.

See also 
List of Nepalese politicians

References

External links

 

1971 births
Communist Party of Nepal (Maoist Centre) politicians
Living people
People from Jajarkot District
Government ministers of Nepal
Nepal Communist Party (NCP) politicians
Nepal MPs 2017–2022
People of the Nepalese Civil War
Members of the 2nd Nepalese Constituent Assembly
Nepal MPs 2022–present